Magnières is a commune in the Meurthe-et-Moselle department in north-eastern France.

Geography
The village lies in the middle of the commune, on the right bank of the river Mortagne, which flows northward through the commune.

See also
Communes of the Meurthe-et-Moselle department

References 

Communes of Meurthe-et-Moselle